Mesaimeer is a district in the municipality of Al Rayyan in Qatar. Located south-west of Doha, it shares borders with the Doha Industrial Area to the east, Umm Al Seneem, Abu Hamour and Al Mamoura to the north-west, Al Thumama to the east, and Wadi Aba Saleel and Jery Musabbeh to the south-east.

Etymology
The district derives its name from the Arabic word "musmar", meaning "nail". Regionally, the term "musmar" is used to describe dark-colored jagged stones with heads that resemble nails. As these stones are found abundantly in the area, it was decided that its name would reflect this feature.

History

According to oral history, in 1851, the inhabitants of Mesaimeer launched an invasion of Doha. Upon realizing that each tribe defending Doha had their own distinct flags, Jassim bin Mohammed Al Thani decided to inaugurate a new flag which would eventually become Qatar's modern-day flag after several alterations.

In 1908, J.G. Lorimer made note of Mesaimeer in his Gazetteer of the Persian Gulf, giving its location as "7 miles south of Dohah and 8 from the east coast". He goes on to state:

In 2008, the first Christian church in Qatar, Catholic Church of Our Lady of the Rosary, was constructed in Mesaimeer's religious complex. The government agreed to allow the Evangelical Churches Alliance Qatar to construct a church in the complex in 2015, and construction on the church was set to begin in 2016. Today, the 'Religious Complex' comprises many churches, including the Syro Malabar Church, the Malankara Catholic Church, the Pentecostal churches, Malankara Orthadox Church, Anglican Church etc.

Landmarks

Medical Commission Department (Supreme Council of Health) on Al Muntazah Street.
Mesaimeer Service Center, General Directorate of Passports and Expatriates Affairs on Abu Hamour Street.
 Workers Health Center Mesaimeer, Qatar Red Crescent Medical Affairs, near Religious Complex; providing healthcare to half million single male workers annually.
Police Department on Abu Hamour Street.
Mesaimeer Graveyard on Barwa Commercial Avenue.
Mesaimeer Health Centre on Wholesale Market Street.
Al Meera Supercenter in Mesaimeer.
WOQOD Vehicle Inspection (FAHES), a subsidiary of Qatar Fuel, opened a vehicle inspection center in Mesaimeer in January 2015 at the cost QR 18 million. It was the company's third center of its kind.

Sports
The district is currently represented by Mesaimeer SC, a multi-sports club whose football team competes in the Qatar Stars League.

Transport
Currently, the at-grade Mesaimeer Metro Station is under construction, having been launched during Phase 2A. Once completed, it will be part of Doha Metro's Green Line.

Development

A project known as 'Masaken Mesaimeer' was launched by Barwa Group in February 2009. The project is set to construct 1,000 residential housing units, a supermarket, a nursery, and a mosque within a gated compound.

Another housing project headed by Barwa Group known as Barwa City, situated between Mesaimeer and Abu Hamour, received its first occupants in 2012. Barwa City contains 6,968 housing units spread across 128 buildings, and covers an area of 1.35 million sq meters. It is planned to have its own school, mosque, shopping center and health care center.

Education

The following schools are located in Mesaimeer:

References

Populated places in Al Rayyan